The siege of Navarino was a military engagement between the Holy League fleet led by John of Austria who besieged the Ottoman garrison in Navarino.  The siege ended in failure and the withdrawal of the Christian Armada.

Prelude

on September 9, having learned about the newly built ottoman fleet stationed at Navarino, don john led the armada of 253 ships, with the Spanish in the center while the Venetians and papal fleets on either side, on September 18, Don John called the council on how to deal with Turkish admiral, it was then resolved to force their way to Modon and besiege it., the fleet anchored at Sapienza to fetch some water, the Turks attacked them but withdrew upon landing reinforcements.

The fleet made plans and several efforts to enter the harbor of Modon, but all efforts ended in vain due to Ottoman solid defenses. The fleet arrived in Navarino to keep an eye on the ottoman fleet at Modon, on 20 September, some 30 ottoman galleys from Modon arrived to find out what the armada of the league was up to but Álvaro de Bazán forced them to withdraw.

Siege

On 21 September, the Turks, occupying the castle which overlooked the Bay of Navarino fired their cannons at the armada, Don John dispatched 20 galleys to Zakynthos for German infantry reinforcements, on 27 September, they sailed into the bay of Navarino, however, the channel was too narrow to enter and the Turkish guns were mounted on the shore, preventing them to enter.

On October 2, Don john landed 5000 troops led by Alexander Farnese ashore to capture the castle at Navarino, during the night, they climbed the steep slope to the Turkish castle, the allied troops made several attempts to capture the castle, the garrison was enforced by detachments from Modon,  and the siege ended in failure, resulting in the death of 750 men, upon learning the news of Reinforcements of 20,000 cavalries from the Beylerbey of Greece, the allies re-embarked on October 7, the first anniversary of Lepanto, don john announced the end of the campaign and the Venetians were distressed.

As the galleys paid their last visit to Modon, they discovered that twenty Ottoman galleys were chasing a ship, the Christians quickened their pace to meet the Ottoman galleys trying to cut them off from re-entering Modon, and the Ottomans gave up their attempt to capture the ship, however, Occhiali sent 15 Galleys to reinforce the rest of the galleys and bombard the Christian fleet, all of the Ottoman galleys successfully reached Modon except one, which Alvaro de Bazen captured.

Miguel de Cervantes, the famous Spanish writer participated in the siege of Navarino.

References 

1572 in the Ottoman Empire
Conflicts in 1572
Ionian Sea
Naval battles of the Ottoman–Venetian Wars
Naval battles involving the Ottoman Empire
Naval battles involving the Republic of Venice
Naval battles involving Spain
Naval battles involving the Papal States